Pogonolepis is a genus of Australian plants in the tribe Gnaphalieae within the family Asteraceae.

Species
, Plants of the World Online accepts three species:
 Pogonolepis lanigera (Ewart & Jean White) P.S.Short - Western Australia
 Pogonolepis muelleriana (Sond.) P.S.Short - New South Wales, Victoria, South Australia, Western Australia
 Pogonolepis stricta Steetz - Western Australia

, other sources list only two species, omitting Pogonolepis lanigera,
 which is treated as a synonym of Pogonolepis stricta.

References

Endemic flora of Australia
Asteraceae genera
Gnaphalieae
Taxa named by Joachim Steetz
Plants described in 1845